Grand County is a county on the east central edge of the U.S. state of Utah, United States. As of the 2010 United States Census, the population was 9,225. Its county seat and largest city is Moab.

History
Evidence of indigenous occupation up to 10,000BCE has been previously discovered in Grand County. The present city of Moab is the site of pueblo farming communities of the 11th and 12th centuries. These groups had already vanished from the area when the first European explorers entered the country, with nomadic Ute tribes inhabiting the area at the time of contact.

The European-based settlement of the area began with the arrival of Mormon pioneers in 1847. By 1855 they had sent missionary settlers into eastern Utah Territory. An Elk Mountain Mission was established but closed after a few months due to Indian raids. For several decades after that, the future Moab area (known as "Spanish Valley") was visited only by trappers and prospectors. Permanent settlement began in 1877. These early settlers, coming in from the north, encountered the deep canyon walls of the Grand River and could not take wagons over or around the steep canyon walls.

They unloaded their supplies, dismantled the wagons, and lowered them by rope to the river valley. They then drove their oxen over a canyon rim, down deep sand dunes. After the wagons were reassembled and supplies reloaded, they made their way through the deep sand to the river. They found a place to ford the river below the present bridge in north Moab. They later established a ferry at the crossing site, which remained in use until the first bridge was built in 1921.

In 1881 the area was known as Grand Valley, and Moab was a "wild west" town. A 1991 visitor to Moab later said it was the toughest town in Utah because the area and surrounding country have many deep canyons, rivers, mountains, and wilderness areas, becoming a hideout for outlaws.  The local economy was initially based on farming and livestock. Mining came in at the end of the 19th century, and the railroad arrived. The first school in the county was started in 1881. Mormon settlers began planting fruit trees by 1879, and by 1910 Moab was a significant fruit-production center.

Due to the distances involved, the settlers of eastern Emery County found it difficult to conduct county business in that county's seat. By March 13, 1890, their petitions caused the Utah Territory legislature to designate the eastern portion of the county as a separate entity, to be named Grand County, named for the Grand River (whose name was changed to Colorado River in 1921). The county boundaries were adjusted in 1892 and in 2003.

Exploration for deep petroleum deposits began in the 1920s, and this industry has significantly contributed to the economy since that time. Other significant industries include uranium mining and filmmaking.

Geography
Grand County lies on the east side of Utah. Its east border abuts the west border of the state of Colorado. The Green River flows southward through the eastern part of central Utah, and its meandering course defines the western border of Grand County. The Colorado River enters the east side of Grand County from Colorado, flowing southwestward toward its confluence with the Green in San Juan County, south of Grand. The Dolores River also enters Grand County from Colorado, flowing westward to its confluence with the Colorado River near Dewey.

Grand County terrain is arid, rough, and spectacularly carved by water and wind erosion, exposing red rock formations that have created a solid tourist industry. The area is little used for agriculture unless irrigation is available. The terrain is filled with hills and protuberances, but generally slopes to the south and to the west. Its highest point is Mount Waas in the SE part of the county, at 12,336' (3760m) ASL. Deserts, cliffs and plateaus make up the scenery, with few settlements apart from the city of Moab, a Colorado River oasis. Arches National Park lies in the southern part of the county, just north of Moab. A northern portion of Canyonlands National Park lies in the southwest corner of the county.

Airport
 Canyonlands Field (CNY) northwest of Moab

Major highways
 United States Interstate I-70
 US-191
 Utah State Highway UT-128
 Utah State Highway UT-313

Adjacent counties

 Uintah County - north
 Garfield County, Colorado - northeast
 Mesa County, Colorado - east
 Montrose County, Colorado - southeast
 San Juan County - south
 Emery County - west
 Carbon County - northwest

Protected areas

 Arches National Park
 Canyonlands National Park (part)
 Dead Horse Point State Park (part)
 Manti-La Sal National Forest (part)
 McInnis Canyons National Conservation Area (part)

Lakes and reservoirs
 Beaver Pond
 Big Flat Reservoir
 Blue Flat Reservoir
 Crescent Wash Reservoir
 Dead Sheep Pond
 Dons Lake
 Hidden Lake
 Holding Pond
 Jackson Reservoir
 Ken's Lake
 Mud Lake
 Oowah Lake
 Pace Lake
 Rock Corral Reservoir
 Strychnine Pond
 Tenmile Wash Reservoir
 Tie Pond
 Twin Pond
 Valley City Reservoir
 Warner Lake
 Weaver Reservoir
 Yellow Cat Reservoir

Demographics

As of the 2000 United States Census, there were 8,485 people, 3,434 households, and 2,170 families in the county. The population density was 2.31/sqmi (0.89/km2). There were 4,062 housing units at an average density of 1.11/sqmi (0.43/km2). The racial makeup of the county was 92.65% White, 0.25% Black or African American, 3.85% Native American, 0.22% Asian, 0.05% Pacific Islander, 1.66% from other races, and 1.32% from two or more races.  5.55% of the population were Hispanic or Latino of any race.

There were 3,434 households, out of which 29.80% had children under the age of 18 living with them, 48.60% were married couples living together, 10.70% had a female householder with no husband present, and 36.80% were non-families. 29.50% of all households were made up of individuals, and 9.50% had someone living alone who was 65 years of age or older.  The average household size was 2.44, and the average family size was 3.06.

The county population contained 26.90% under the age of 18, 8.20% from 18 to 24, 27.90% from 25 to 44, 24.50% from 45 to 64, and 12.50% who were 65 years of age or older. The median age was 37 years. For every 100 females, there were 96.30 males. For every 100 females aged 18 and over, there were 95.10 males.

The median income for a household in the county was $32,387, and the median income for a family was $39,095. Males had a median income of $31,000 versus $21,769 for females. The per capita income for the county was $17,356.  About 10.90% of families and 14.80% of the population were below the poverty line, including 21.20% of those under age 18 and 8.40% of those aged 65 or over.

Grand County is the Utah county with the lowest percentage of LDS Church members in the state. Utah's population is about 62% Mormon, while Grand County is about 26% Mormon.

Politics and government
Historically, following the period of William Jennings Bryan and Woodrow Wilson, Grand County has generally voted Republican. Between 1920 and 1988 (inclusive), it voted Democratic only four times: thrice for Franklin Roosevelt, and once for Lyndon Johnson. However, it has shifted leftward in recent years, voting Democratic thrice in the last eight elections (for Bill Clinton in 1992, Barack Obama in 2008, and Joe Biden in 2020). The highest vote share any Republican has received in the county in the last eight elections was 51.1% (by George W. Bush in 2004); Joe Biden's 53.9% was the highest vote share for any nominee of either party since 1988, as well as the highest for a Democrat in the county since 1936.

Grand County is one of only thirteen counties to have voted for Obama in 2008, Romney in 2012, Trump in 2016, and Biden in 2020.

Moab has a significant environmentalist population due to nearby Arches National Park and Canyonlands National Park.

Sagebrush Rebellion

Grand County was an epicenter of the Sagebrush Rebellion, which took place during the late 1970s and early 1980s when residents protested what they saw as overreaching Federal control of Western US land.

An early event in the Rebellion was July 4, 1980, when 300 Grand County residents gathered behind a flag-decorated bulldozer in protest of the inclusion of Mill Creek Canyon as part of a Bureau of Land Management wilderness study area. Despite plowing nearly 200 yards up the canyon, the group did not reach the study area's boundary.

Paleontology
The Denver Museum of Natural History opened a small Cedar Mountain Formation quarry that has produced diverse dinosaur fossils including theropod, sauropod and ornithopod. An adult sauropod was designated the type specimen of the genus Venenosaurus.

Communities

Cities
 Moab (county seat)

Towns
 Castle Valley

Census-designated places
 Thompson Springs

Unincorporated communities
 Castleton
 Cisco
 Dewey
 Mesa
 Richardson
 Westwater

Former communities
 Agate
 Basin
 Cottonwood
 Elba
 Floy
 Harley Dome
 Sego
 Valley City

See also

 National Register of Historic Places listings in Grand County, Utah
 Greentown Gas Condensate Field
 Moab uranium mill tailings pile
List of counties in Utah

Notes

References

External links

 

 
1890 establishments in Utah Territory
Populated places established in 1890